Rottum is a village in De Fryske Marren in the province of Friesland, the Netherlands. It had a population of around 675 in 2017.

History
It was first mentioned in the late 13th century as Ruthne. A chapel was constructed in the 14th century, and the judge for  had its seat in Rottum. Landtags were also held in the village. The chapel was replaced by a church in 1414, and demolished in 1791. Only the bell tower remains. In 1840, it was home to 209 people.

Before 1934, Rottum was part of the  municipality.

Notable people 
 Antoinette de Jong (born 1995), speed skater

Gallery

References

External links

De Fryske Marren
Populated places in Friesland